Seigfried Gande is a Papua New Guinean rugby league international. His position is second row.

Playing career
A Goroka Lahanis player in the Papua New Guinea National Rugby League, Gande was first selected for Papua New Guinea in 2009. He played against the Prime Minister's XIII and in two matches at the 2009 Pacific Cup. He was selected for the 2010 Four Nations, but withdrew due to injury.

In 2014, Gande was still competing for Goroka, before retiring to work for the Papua New Guinea Rugby Football League as a development officer.

References

Papua New Guinean rugby league players
Papua New Guinean sportsmen
Living people
Papua New Guinea national rugby league team players
Year of birth missing (living people)
Place of birth missing (living people)
Rugby league second-rows
Goroka Lahanis players